Pie Corbett (born 3 April 1954) is an English educational trainer, writer, author and poet who has written more than two hundred books. He is now best known for creating the Talk for Writing approach to learning, which is widely used within UK primary schools.

He is also known for promoting creative approaches in the classroom and has experience as a teacher, head teacher and Ofsted inspector. He regularly lectures on education all around the United Kingdom. The UK government has consulted Pie Corbett as an educational advisor. However, Corbett has been a vocal critic of the Conservative government's approach to testing in schools, particularly the testing of grammar.

Early life and education
Corbett was born and raised in Sedlescombe, East Sussex, on a farm where he was one of five brothers. He studied Education at East Sussex College of Higher Education.

Career

Writing
Corbett has written a number of books, aimed specifically to benefit learning in primary school children. With his daughter Poppy Corbett
he is the co-author of The Enormous Book of Talk for Writing Games (London: Philip and Tacey, 2013).

He has contributed regularly to the Times Educational Supplement. He has also been the editor or co-editor of many collections of poems. Early in his writing career he published a popular collection of poetry with Brian Moses and John Rice entitled Rice Pie and Moses. He has been featured on various CDs and DVDs concerning education and/or poetry.

Teaching

He was a primary school teacher with Brian Moses, where he taught maths and wrote poetry.  He became a headmaster.

He was heavily involved in the creation of the i-read software at the Hitachi laboratory at Cambridge University. The purpose of the software is to help children learn how to read via "visual and auditory props".

Corbett, while working at the University of Gloucestershire, created the Articled Teacher Scheme. He also created a unique "storytelling approach" for children to remember stories with and results with improved literacy. This method was then taken up by the National Strategies 'Talk for writing' programme, after he presented it to The National Strategies organization in 2008. Corbett was also the creator of the Storymaking Schools Programme for the Story Museum, along with making the "poetry objectives for the National Literacy Strategy."

In 2008, Corbett was asked by the English Ministers of Education to make a "classroom DVD on how to encourage pupils to write".

Talk for Writing

Pie Corbett is now best known in schools as the creator of the Talk for Writing approach.

Bibliography
 "Talk for Writing across the Curriculum with DVD: How to teach non-fiction writing 5-12 years (2011) 
 Talk for Writing in the Early Years: How to teach story and rhyme, involving families 2-5 years"
 Jumpstart! Literacy: Games and Activities for Ages 7–14 (2004) 
 All in the Start Writing Poetry Jumpstart! Storymaking: Games and Activities for Ages 7–12 (2009)
 Jumpstart! Poetry: Games and Activities for Ages 7–12 (2008)
 The works: poems for key stage 2 – every kind of poem you will ever need for the Literacy Hour (2006)
 Cats, hats, and hippos (2004)
 Chatting Cheetahs And Jumping Jellyfish (2004)
 Literacy: What Works? (2003)
 Writing'' (1997)

References 

Living people
1954 births
British educational theorists
People from Sedlescombe